

Karl von Wohlgemuth (15 September 1917 – 29 August 1983) was a general in the Austrian Armed Forces. During World War II, he served as an officer in the Wehrmacht and was a recipient of the Knight's Cross of the Iron Cross of Nazi Germany.

Awards and decorations

 Knight's Cross of the Iron Cross on 30 September 1944 as Major and commander of Divisions-Füsilier-Bataillon 1

References

 

1917 births
1983 deaths
Military personnel from Vienna
Austrian generals
Austrian military personnel of World War II
Recipients of the Gold German Cross
Recipients of the Knight's Cross of the Iron Cross
World War II prisoners of war held by the United Kingdom
German prisoners of war in World War II
Theresian Military Academy alumni